William Henry Kirk (11 October 1912–1991) was an English professional footballer who played in the Football League for Mansfield Town.

References

1912 births
1991 deaths
English footballers
Association football forwards
English Football League players
Grantham Town F.C. players
Mansfield Town F.C. players
Gainsborough Trinity F.C. players
West Ham United F.C. players
Yeovil Town F.C. players
Worcester City F.C. players